Dora Varella (born 31 July 2001) is a Brazilian professional skateboarder. She has competed in women's park events at several World Skateboarding Championships, finishing 15th in 2018 and sixth in 2019.

Varella participated in the women's park event at the 2021 Tokyo Olympics, finishing seventh in the finals. Heading into the games, she ranked ninth in the Olympic World Skateboarding Rankings for women's park.

References

External links
 
 Dora Varella at The Boardr

Living people
2001 births
Brazilian skateboarders
Brazilian sportswomen
Female skateboarders
Olympic skateboarders of Brazil
Skateboarders at the 2020 Summer Olympics
Sportspeople from São Paulo
21st-century Brazilian women